The first season of Paris Hilton's My New BFF aired from September 30 to December 2, 2008, on MTV in the United States, and consists of 10 episodes and 4 specials.

Season overview
Prior to production, a website was set up for potential contestants to submit their videos on why they should be Paris' BFF, and casting sessions were also set up. Initially, the 18 people with the highest votes from other users would go on the show. However, the ten contestants with the most votes went on while the other eight were selected by the producers. 

Sixteen women and three men competed in challenges in an attempt to become Hilton's new best friend. Four of the female contestants were eliminated in the first episode and hence did not feature in promotional material (photo shoots, TV spots or even the opening credits) for the season. Guest stars included Benji Madden, Kyle Richards, Richie Rich, Traver Rains, Kathy Hilton, Fergie, Simple Plan, Chris Applebaum, Perez Hilton, Dirt Nasty, Allison Melnick, Ryan Seacrest, Nicky Hilton, Keyshia Cole, Hanna Beth Merjos and Nick Swardson.

Though Hilton was forbidden from revealing the winner before the season finale aired, she had on two separate occasions accidentally referred to the winner as "she" —first on the September 25, 2008 airing of the Late Show with David Letterman, and again on the October 7, 2008 airing of The Ellen DeGeneres Show. On December 2, 2008, it was revealed in the finale that Brittany Flickinger had won the contest.

Contestants

Elimination table

 During the first elimination in episode 5, everyone was up for discussion. The contestants shaded in blue and red were up for discussion in the second elimination.
 Beginning in episode 8, every contestant would be up for elimination.
 In episode 10, during elimination Paris left the rooftop where panel was held. Brittany and Vanessa were drove to two different places. Vanessa arrived at a hotel room. There was a note that said she was eliminated.

Key
 The contestant became Paris' new BFF.
 The contestant won the episode's challenge and was safe from elimination.
 The contestant was not eliminated in that episode.
 The contestant was in the bottom, replaced with someone else, and therefore was safe.
 The contestant was up for elimination, but was safe.
 The contestant was eliminated by another contestant.
 The contestant was eliminated.
 The contestant won the episode's challenge and was up for elimination.

Episodes

References

External links
 Paris Hilton's My New BFF Official Website
 Paris Hilton's My New BFF Casting Website
 Paris Hilton Fansite with show coverage & updates
 Paris Hilton's Official Myspace Page

2008 American television seasons